Anaciaeschna is a genus of dragonflies in the family Aeshnidae.
Species of Anaciaeschna are found in Africa, Asia and Australia.

Anaciaeschna are large, tawny brown dragonflies. They are nomadic and crepuscular.

Species
The genus Anaciaeschna includes the following species:
Anaciaeschna donaldi 
Anaciaeschna (Aeshna) isosceles  – green-eyed hawker, Norfolk hawker
Anaciaeschna jaspidea  – Australasian duskhawker
Anaciaeschna kashimirensis 
Anaciaeschna martini 
Anaciaeschna megalopis 
Anaciaeschna melanostoma 
Anaciaeschna moluccana 
Anaciaeschna montivagans 
Anaciaeschna triangulifera  – evening hawker

References

Aeshnidae
Anisoptera genera
Odonata of Africa
Odonata of Asia
Odonata of Australia
Taxa named by Edmond de Sélys Longchamps
Insects described in 1878
Taxonomy articles created by Polbot